Dan August Rigo (born August 6, 1986) is a Filipino-Canadian recording artist, songwriter, producer and musician. August Rigo is signed to a publishing contract with Sony/ATV as a songwriter.

Early life
Rigo was born on August 6, 1986, in Toronto. He became passionate about music when he watched Michael Jackson's performance of "Billie Jean" on Motown's 25th Anniversary TV Show. He taught himself to play keyboards and guitar while in his teens.

Music career
He Co-wrote U Smile, "Stuck in the Moment" and "Kiss And Tell" for Justin Bieber, Solo for Iyaz and Outta this World for JLS.  He is featured on Cheryl Cole's second album, Messy Little Raindrops, on the song Better To Lie. He is the executive producer of Musiq Soulchild's 2011 release of "musiqinthemagiq" and co-wrote "Anything", "SayIDo", "Silver & Gold", "WaitingStill" and "BackToWhere".

In 2010, August secured a publishing deal with Sony/ATV as well as an admin society deal with BMI. He is also signed with Island Def Jam Records.

In October 2011, August released his first single "Here Comes Trouble" featuring Busta Rhymes on Alpine Music Group/Island DefJam. He also released his promo mixtape "Too Big To Fail" online.

Rigo produced and featured on YouTube rapper D-Pryde's mixtapes "Once Again" (2012) and "Mars" (2011), as well as D-Pryde's first EP Canal&Richvale (2013)

On September 18th, 2015, August Rigo released the Japanese version of his album "The Fall Out" on Manhattan Records in Japan. "The Fall Out" was released independently on Rigo's label "Summerchild Records" in Canada on November 6th, 2015. The album was nominated for a Juno Award for Best R&B/Soul Recording.

Discography

Singles written
 2010: "Solo" (Iyaz)
 2010: "Change Positions"  (Pleasure P) 
 2010: "Up & Running" (Jessica Jarrell)
 2011: "Gotta Be You" (One Direction)
 2011: "Party All Night (Sleep All Day)" (Sean Kingston)
 2011: "Anything" (Musiq Soulchild)
 2015: "Back To Sleep" (Chris Brown) 
 2017: "Back 2 U (AM 1:27)"  (NCT 127) 
 2018: "1,2,3" (NCT Dream) 
 2019: "Betcha" (Baekhyun) 
 2020: "Black Swan"  (BTS) 
 2020: "On"  (BTS) 
 2021: "Anticipation" (Leanne and Naara)
 2022: "Hot" (Seventeen) 
 2022: "" (JKT48)

Songs written
2010
Justin Bieber – My World 2.0
 3. "Stuck in the Moment"
 4. "U Smile"
 11. "Kiss and Tell" (iTunes bonus track)"

Iyaz – Replay
 2. "Solo"

JLS – Outta This World
 3. "Outta This World"
 5. "Work"
 6. "I Know What She Like"
 11. "Love at War"

Girlicious – Rebuilt
 5. "Unlearn Me"
 9. "Over You

Cheryl Cole – Messy Little Raindrops
 9. "Better to Lie"

D-Pryde - "MARS"
 13. '"Big Shot"
2011
Mindless Behavior – Number 1 Girl
 3. "Future"

Musiq Soulchild – MusiqInTheMagiq	
 1. "Anything"
 3. "Sayido"
 5. "Silver&Gold"
 6. "WaitingStill"
 7. "Backtowhere"
 13. "Clumsylove" (iTunes bonus track)
2014
Jesse McCartney – Have It All
 3. "The Writer"
2015
Chris Brown – Royalty
 1. "Back To Sleep"
2017
Kehlani - SweetSexySavage
 2. Keep On
2017
Chris Brown - Heartbreak on a Full Moon
 27. Tough Love

References

1986 births
Living people
Canadian musicians of Filipino descent
Canadian pop musicians
Canadian record producers
Canadian songwriters
Musicians from Toronto
Writers from Toronto